Admiral Dewey Larry (born September 1, 1958) is a former American football player who played two seasons with the Arizona Wranglers and Ottawa Rough Riders. He was drafted by the New York Jets in the ninth round of the 1981 NFL Draft. He played college football at the University of Nevada, Las Vegas.

References

External links
Just Sports Stats
College Stats

Living people
1958 births
Players of American football from New Orleans
Players of Canadian football from New Orleans
American football running backs
American football defensive backs
Canadian football running backs
American players of Canadian football
UNLV Rebels football players
Arizona Wranglers players
Ottawa Rough Riders players